Diana Frey (born August 16, 1944) is an Argentine film producer and production manager active in the Cinema of Argentina since 1976.

She has produced a number of significant Argentine pictures such as Alambrado (1991), Plata quemada (2000) and El Fondo del mar (2003).

Filmography 
 Juan que reía - 1976
 La República perdida - 1983
 State of Reality (Darse cuenta) - 1984
 Waiting for the Hearse (Esperando la carroza) - 1985
 Sofía - 1987
 I Don't Owe 100 Times (Cien veces no debo) - 1990
 Barbed Wire (Alambrado) - 1991
 Burnt Money (Plata quemada) - 2000
 Three Wives (Tre mogli) - 2001
 Bottom of the Sea (El Fondo del Mar) - 2003
 Paco Urondo, la palabra justa - 2005
 Nuovomondo - 2006
 Resurrectores - 2007
 Maradona, the Hand of God (Maradona, la mano di Dio) - 2007

Television 
 ¿Donde queda el paraíso? (1993) (TV producer)
 Locos de contento (1993) (TV producer)
 ''Dulce Ana (1995) (TV Series executive producer)
 Amor sagrado (1996) (TV Series executive producer)

References

External links 
 
 

1944 births
Argentine film producers
Argentine women film producers
Living people
People from Buenos Aires
Argentine people of German descent